Grant Ian Brebner (born 6 December 1977) is a Scottish football coach and former player who was the head coach at Australian side Melbourne Victory. Born in Edinburgh, Brebner joined Manchester United as a 16-year-old in 1994. While at Manchester United, he broke into the Scotland under-21 team, making 17 appearances between 1997 and 1999; however, he was unable to find a place in the Manchester United first team and was loaned out to Cambridge United and Hibernian, before being sold to Reading for £300,000 in 1998. He then returned to Hibernian on a permanent basis, and made more than 100 appearances in a five-year stint there that included a loan spell with Stockport County. In August 2004, he was transferred to Dundee United, before moving to Australia to play for Melbourne Victory. After six years with Melbourne Victory, he joined Victorian Premier League side Moreland Zebras. He returned to Melbourne Victory as an assistant coach in 2020, before assuming the position of manager later that year, where he served until being dismissed from the position in April 2021.

Club career

Early career
On leaving school in 1994, Brebner signed for Manchester United as an apprentice, playing in the FA Youth Cup winning side of 1995 and turning professional soon after. FourFourTwo magazine hailed him as the latest big talent to be produced by Manchester United's youth system.

After four years in United's youth and reserve teams, Brebner was loaned to Cambridge United, where he scored his first senior goal while making six appearances. A further loan spell was spent back in Edinburgh at Hibernian, where Brebner suffered relegation at the end of the 1997–98 season.

Brebner was then transferred permanently to Reading at the start of the 1998–99 season. He was already 21 years old, but had never played a single first-team game for Manchester United. During his time at Reading, he scored 10 goals in 41 league games. He was also responsible for scoring the first ever goal at the Madejski Stadium, but he suffered from homesickness during his time at the club.

Scotland
After just one season with Reading, Brebner returned to Hibernian on a permanent deal. Brebner moved on loan again to Stockport County during the 2000–01 season, but then established himself in the Hibs first team, playing in the 2001 Scottish Cup Final and the UEFA Cup. Brebner scored a hat-trick against future employers Dundee United in a Scottish Cup match in February 2003. He was latterly club captain at Hibs, and was a senior player in the side with young stars like Kevin Thomson and Scott Brown.

Brebner was surprisingly transferred to Dundee United in August 2004, despite having just signed a three-year contract with Hibs. He missed just three matches in his first season with United and scored seven times from 64 appearances in all for United. Following a change in management at the club, however, Brebner was informed by his new manager Craig Brewster in April 2006 that he would be allowed to leave the club at the end of the 2005–06 season.

Melbourne Victory
On 26 May 2006, Brebner was reported by BBC Sport to be attracting interest from Melbourne Victory. He subsequently flew to Australia for talks with the A-League club. Brebner came on as a trialist and scored for Victory with seconds remaining, in the QNI North Queensland Challenge Trophy game versus Central Coast Mariners on 18 June. Securing a 2–2 draw, Brebner then scored the winning penalty to seal a 4–2 shoot-out win. On Brebner's performance, Victory manager Ernie Merrick said: "There's not too much more you can do when you're on trial than come in and win the game, is there?". In Victory's second match on 20 June, Brebner completed the full 90 minutes, playing in a 3–1 win over Chinese team Changchun Yatai. Brebner completed a successful trial period by netting a 28-yard free-kick as Victory won the trophy with a 6–1 win over the Chinese team in the final, on 24 June.

On the back of his impressive displays during his trial, Brebner was signed to a full-time contract with the Melbourne Victory, having agreed on a deal to be released from his Dundee United contract. In his first season, he helped the Victory win the 2006–07 A-League premiership with five rounds remaining. The round 19 clash with Perth Glory away at Members Equity Stadium saw Brebner take the captain's armband for the first time in the absence of regular captain Kevin Muscat and vice-captain Archie Thompson. He scored the last of the five goals against Newcastle Jets in round 3 of the 2008–09 season. This was his second goal for the club, after scoring a late winner against Perth Glory in the 2006–07 season.

Brebner received Australian residency status at the start of 2009, which meant he no longer counted towards the Victory's overseas player quota.

Betting controversy
In December 2008, Brebner was fined A$5,000 and banned for four matches after betting on Victory to lose an AFC Champions League match against Chonburi. Brebner, who won under $550 in the bet, was not part of the squad. Craig Moore and Kevin Muscat were also fined after betting on matches not involving their own clubs. Brebner had previously confessed to being a gambling addict, losing more than £100,000, and received professional help for his addiction.

Managerial career
In 2013, Brebner took over the management of the football teams at Mazenod College in Mulgrave, Victoria, while also playing for the local club side, Mazenod United. Later that year, he took over as manager of Richmond SC, but resigned in April 2014. In 2020, he returned to Melbourne Victory as the club's assistant manager under interim coach Carlos Pérez Salvachúa, he was later appointed as the Victory's caretaker manager upon the departure of the latter. On 24 August 2020, Brebner was appointed as Melbourne Victory's manager. Brebner's tenure as Melbourne Victory manager coincided with the worst run of results in Melbourne Victory's history. He was sacked as head coach shortly after Victory's 7–0 loss to local rivals Melbourne City in April 2021, a result which came only a month and a half after losing 6–0 to the same team.

Brebner possesses a UEFA A License.

Career statistics

Managerial statistics

Honours
Melbourne Victory
 A-League Championship: 2006–07, 2008–09
 A-League Premiership: 2006–07, 2008–09

References

External links

1977 births
Living people
Scottish footballers
Manchester United F.C. players
Cambridge United F.C. players
Hibernian F.C. players
Reading F.C. players
Stockport County F.C. players
Dundee United F.C. players
Melbourne Victory FC players
English Football League players
Scottish Football League players
Scottish Premier League players
A-League Men players
Scottish expatriate footballers
Scottish expatriate sportspeople in Australia
Footballers from Edinburgh
Scotland under-21 international footballers
Association football midfielders
Lothian Thistle Hutchison Vale F.C. players
Scottish expatriate football managers
Expatriate soccer players in Australia
Expatriate soccer managers in Australia
A-League Men managers
Melbourne Victory FC managers
Moreland Zebras FC players